Charaka shapath (or, Charaka oath) is a certain passage of text in Charaka Samhita, a Sanskrit text on Ayurveda (Indian traditional medicine) believed to have been composed between 100 BCE and 200 CE. The passage referred to as Charaka Shapath is written in the form a set of instructions by a teacher to prospective students of the science of medicine. According to Charaka Samhita, the unconditional agreement to abide by these instructions is a necessary precondition to be eligible to be taught in the science of medicine. The passage gives explicit instructions on the necessity of practicing asceticism during student life, student-teacher relationship, the importance of committing oneself fully and completely for the well-being of the patient,  whom to treat, how to behave with women, and several other related issues. The passage appears as paragraphs 13–14 in Chapter 8 of the Vimanasthana (the third Sthana) in Charaka Samhita.

Charaka Shapath: Text in Devanagari with English translation

The original text of Charaka Shapath in the Sanskrit language in the Devanagari script along with an English translation of the same is reproduced below. The text and translation are taken mostly from Charaka Samhita, Shree Galabkuverba Ayurveic Society, Jamnagar India, 1947, Volume II, pp. 865–871. The original Sanskrit version is also available as an ebook in the portal of the National Institute of Indian Medical Heritage, Hyderabad.

Charaka oath to replace Hippocratic oath in Medical Colleges in India?

In a discussion meeting with the authorities of all medical colleges in India, the National Medical Commission of India presented a proposal to replace the Hippocratic Oath with the "Maharshi Charaka Shapath" while conducting the white coat ceremony with parents in medical colleges. However, several medical practitioners individually and collectively have protested against the proposal.

Additional reading

For another English translation of the Charak shapath see:

References

Oaths of medicine